Aleksandra Sikorska (born ) is a Polish volleyball player. She is part of the Poland women's national volleyball team.

She participated in the 2015 FIVB Volleyball World Grand Prix.
On club level she played for Budowlani in 2014.

References

External links
 Profile at FIVB.org

External links
http://www.scoresway.com/zgorzelec?sport=volleyball&page=player&id=6669
http://www.cev.lu/competition-area/PlayerDetails.aspx?TeamID=9580&PlayerID=6338&ID=883

1993 births
Living people
Polish women's volleyball players
Sportspeople from Warsaw